Kyle Hagel (born January 21, 1985) is a Canadian former professional ice hockey defenseman. He played 373 games in the American Hockey League and is currently an assistant coach of the Seattle Thunderbirds in the Western Hockey League (WHL).

Playing career
Hagel played collegiate hockey with Princeton University in the ECAC conference and was undrafted . Upon completion of his senior season with the Tigers, Hagel made his professional debut in the 2008–09 season with the Fresno Falcons of the ECHL.

On May 8, 2011 the St. Louis Blues announced that they had signed Hagel as a free-agent to a one-year contract.

After only seven games with the Blues AHL affiliate, the Peoria Rivermen, due to injuries, Hagel was then signed a one-year contract to remain in the AHL with the Hamilton Bulldogs for the 2012–13 season. In 67 games with the lowly Bulldogs, Hagel scored 2 goals and 6 points whilst recording 172 penalty minutes.

On August 19, 2013, Hagel's journeyman career continued in the AHL, agreeing as a free agent to a one-year contract with the Portland Pirates. Hagel joined his sixth AHL team on July 16, 2014, agreeing to a one-year deal with the Charlotte Checkers.

Hagel added a veteran presence to the Checkers and played three seasons with the club before announcing his retirement from professional hockey on July 21, 2017. Throughout his tenure in the AHL, Hagel's efforts in the community were recognised as he was a 7-time winner of his club's Man of the Year Award. He was the recipient of the Yanick Dupre Memorial Award in 2015.

Personal
His younger brother, Marc (born September 12, 1988) played six games with the Lake Erie Monsters during the 2012–13 AHL season and last played for the Binghamton Senators of the AHL. He was married to Jess Hagel on June 25, 2016.

Career statistics

Awards and honours

References

External links

1985 births
Canadian ice hockey defencemen
Charlotte Checkers (2010–) players
Fresno Falcons players
Hamilton Bulldogs (AHL) players
Ice hockey people from Ontario
Las Vegas Wranglers players
Living people
Ontario Junior Hockey League players
Peoria Rivermen (AHL) players
Portland Pirates players
Princeton Tigers men's ice hockey players
Reading Royals players
Rochester Americans players
Rockford IceHogs (AHL) players
Sportspeople from Hamilton, Ontario